This is a list of Minister for Food, Agriculture and Fisheries of Denmark since the establishment of the Minister for Agriculture in 1896.

Ministers of Food

Ministers of Agriculture

Ministers of Fisheries

References

Food
Agriculture in Denmark
Fishing in Denmark